Quinto di Treviso is a comune (municipality) in the Province of Treviso in the Italian region Veneto, located about  northwest of Venice and about  southwest of Treviso.

In the church of Santa Cristina, a frazione of Quinto,  is a  Lorenzo Lotto's painting, the Santa Cristina al Tiverone Altarpiece.

Quinto di Treviso borders the following municipalities: Morgano, Paese, Treviso, Zero Branco.

People
Red Canzian, singer
Pierpaolo Capovilla, opera singer in the Teatro degli Orrori 
Gianpaolo Dozzo, politician
Fausto Pajar, journalist

References

Cities and towns in Veneto